The Coal River Valley is located in the City of Clarence, Tasmania, and is a primarily agrarian area to the east of the city, located between the townships of Cambridge and Colebrook. With the historic town of Richmond at its heart, it is nestled between the Meehan Range and the Pontos Range.

The Coal River Valley was one of the earliest areas used by the first British settlers outside Hobart; the town of Richmond dates from 1823 when a bridge across the Coal River was constructed. The name Coal River comes from an early discovery of coal in the area. The first British settlers used the valley as a mixture of grazing, pastureland and crop growing.

Its primary land usage is as vineyards and produces very high quality slow maturing cool weather grapes.

The Coal River Valley is sheltered from radio emissions of the city of Hobart by the Meehan Range making it an ideal location for the University of Tasmania's Mount Pleasant Radio Observatory.

External links
Mount Pleasant Observatory
Coal Valley Vineyard

River valleys of Australia
Southern Tasmania
City of Clarence